Portugal competed at the 2012 Summer Paralympics in London, United Kingdom, from August 29 to September 9, 2012. The Paralympic Committee of Portugal was represented by a delegation of 30 competitors (22 men and 8 women) in 5 sports – athletics, boccia, equestrian, rowing and swimming.

The opening ceremony flag bearer was athlete Inês Fernandes.

Medallists

Athletics 

Men

Women

Boccia 

Individual

Pairs and team

Equestrian

Rowing 

Qualification legend: R = Repechage; FA = Final A (1st–6th places); FB = Final B (7th–12th places)

Swimming 

Record legend: WR = World record; PR = Paralympic record; AR = Area record; NR = National record

See also 
Portugal at the Paralympics
Portugal at the 2012 Summer Olympics

References 

Nations at the 2012 Summer Paralympics
2012
2012 in Portuguese sport